Yseult Onguenet (born 19 August 1994), known professionally as Yseult, is a French singer-songwriter and model. She rose to prominence after becoming runner-up on the tenth season of the French reality television series, Nouvelle Star. She subsequently signed to Polydor Records, and released her debut album, Yseult, in January 2015. Since leaving Polydor, she has released three extended plays, Rouge (2019), Noir (2019), and Brut (2020), as an independent artist.

Life and career

1994–2013: Early life 
Yseult Onguenet was born on August 19, 1994, to Cameroonian parents in Tergnier, in the department of Aisne, France. She realized her talent at a young age, however, her father did not allow her to make music, prompting Onguenet to skip classes to audition for the Nouvelle Star in Paris.

2013–2017: Nouvelle Star and career beginnings 
In February 2014, Yseult competed in the final of the Nouvelle Star, having auditioned and made her way through the competition since the show aired in October 2013. She competed in the final against Mathieu Saikaly, the winner of the season, and performed songs such as Roar, Feeling Good, and Wasting My Young Years throughout her duration on the show.

Following the show, Onguenet signed to Polydor Records under the name Yseult, and announced that she was preparing her debut album, working with French composer and singer, Emmanuel Da Silva.

In May 2014, Yseult released the lead single to her album, "La Vague", the video to which she later posted on her Vevo channel. As of December 2020, the music video has over one million views. Prior to the release of her album, she uploaded her covers to It's a Man's Man's Man's World and La Mamma on Youtube.

On January 5, 2015, she released her debut album, titled Yseult. The album peaked at no. 69 on the French album chart, selling just 5,000 copies. The album's commercial performance was a disappointment for both Onguenet and her label, and influenced her decision to end her contract with Polydor a couple years later. Nevertheless, Yseult went on to release three videos for Bye Bye Bye, Pour l'impossible, and Summer Love, all songs from her album, across 2015.

In March 2017, Yseult released her final single with the label, a cover of Blondie's Heart of Glass. In April 2017, she worked in a writing seminar for the Black Eyed Peas, organised by Polydor, after which she decided to end her contract with the label later that year.

2018–present: Rouge, Noir & BRUT EPs and other projects 
After leaving Polydor Records, Yseult signed with IMM management. She modeled for the ASOS Autumn campaign in 2018, starring in several commercials and magazine advertorials. Yseult has since modeled for a number of campaigns, and featured on the cover of French fashion magazine Antidote in 2020.

In 2018, Yseult also established her independent label, YYY, having moved to Brussels, Belgium. The first single under her independent record label, Rien à prouver, was released in January 2019; the song serves as the lead single to her debut extended play, Noir. The music video for Rien à prouver has accumulated over 1.9 million views as of December 2020.

Yseult's second extended play, Rouge, was released as a surprise project in May 2019. The record had no lead single, and was not promoted, rather Yseult described Rouge as "a project that makes a separation between the early Yseult" in Enfnts Terribles magazine.

In 2021, L'Oreal selected Yseult as an international spokesperson for L'Oreal Paris, stating that by "using the power of her songwriting to overcome barriers, she leads a path for other women with the message: Be exactly who you are."

In 2022, she was cast in her first acting role, playing herself in Maïmouna Doucouré's film Hawa.

References 

1994 births
French people of Cameroonian descent
French singer-songwriters
21st-century French women singers
French female models
Living people